In September 2021, a series of environmental protests began in Belgrade and other locations in Serbia. The protests, which were attended by tens of thousands of people, lasted until February 2022. In 2004, Anglo-Australian corporation Rio Tinto was given permission to explore mines near the Jadar Valley, and in 2017, the Government of Serbia signed an agreement to implement "Project Jadar", which would give Rio Tinto permission to exploit the silicate mineral jadarite. The project was initially scheduled to start in 2023. Following the 2020 parliamentary election, the ruling Serbian Progressive Party (SNS) won a supermajority of seats in the National Assembly, and as a response, the National Assembly adopted a law on referendum and people's initiative, and modifications of the expropriation law in November 2021. Both laws were met with opposition from activists and politicians.

Between September 2021 and February 2022, environmental organisations organised protests to demand the government to withdraw the expropriation and referendum laws, and to cancel Project Jadar. Protests resumed in November 2021, and after the adoption of the laws, the protests escalated and became larger. The organisations Ecological Uprising and Kreni-Promeni led a series of roadblock protests, which became violent. The demonstrators were attacked by armed hooligans and pro-government activists; and some of them were detained. After the protests in December, the number of demonstrators decreased. Protests continued up to 15 February 2022. Several protests in support were also organised internationally. The environmental protests received support from opposition political parties and public figures while academics, geologists, and non-governmental organisations criticized the government's decision to support Rio Tinto's investment. The government and individuals associated with it criticised the protests and its organisers.

President Aleksandar Vučić initially stated that the laws would not be repealed but after the escalation of the protests, the expropriation law was withdrawn and the law on referendum was amended on 8 December, while the City Assembly of Loznica abolished the spatial plan that included Rio Tinto's mine investment on 16 December, postponing the corporation's operations until further notice. In January 2022, the government also annulled all administrative acts related to Rio Tinto. Activists said Rio Tinto shortly continued to operate after these remarks but Rio Tinto refuted the claims.

Background 
In December 2004, Anglo-Australian mining corporation Rio Tinto discovered the silicate mineral jadarite in a mine near the Jadar Valley. In July that year, during Vojislav Koštunica's administration, Rio Tinto had been given permission to explore the mines, and in several documents that were signed later, its boundaries of exploration were further extended. The International Mineralogical Association recognised the mineral in November 2006. In 2017, the Government of Serbia signed a memorandum with Rio Tinto to implement "Project Jadar", which would give Rio Tinto permission to exploit mines near Gornje Nedeljice and the Jadar Valley. The project was set to start in 2023 and the production of jadarite batteries was set to begin in 2027.

In November 2021, the National Assembly of Serbia adopted a law on referendum and people's initiative, and modified the country's expropriation law. The law on referendum and people's initiative abolished the 50% threshold that was needed for a referendum to pass. Opposition politicians speculated the amended law would be abused in cases such as Rio Tinto. On 25 November, President Aleksandar Vučić signed the law and stated he would not repeal it. The expropriation law was also met with opposition and gained negative coverage from journalists. It was also criticised by politicians, activists, and lawyers; all of whom have called for its withdrawal. Government officials responded by stating the laws had nothing to do with Rio Tinto.

Related protests 
Environmental protests were held in January 2021 by the initiative "Eco Guard". Around 2,000 protesters attended a protest that was dubbed "Protests for Harmless Air". Several professors and activists, such as Aleksandar Jovanović Ćuta, also attended the protest, which remained peaceful.

In March 2021, Ćuta announced his organisation "Defend the Rivers of Stara Planina" was planning to organise an "Ecological Uprising" protest on 10 April. The protest gained public attention and around 60 environmental organisations participated. The protest was held in front of the House of the National Assembly, and was attended by 2,000 protesters demanding the suspension of all environmentally projects and the adaptation of regulations to the highest environmental standards. Organisations that participated in the protest published a document that included more demands for the government. Prime Minister Ana Brnabić criticised the protesters, although she later affirmed she was ready to discuss their demands.

Timeline

2021

11 September 
The organisation "Ecological Uprising", which was formed by Aleksandar Jovanović Ćuta, announced in August 2021 it would organise a protest on 11 September in Belgrade. Following the announcement, the Party of Freedom and Justice (SSP), Democratic Party (DS), People's Party (Narodna), and the Do not let Belgrade drown (NDB) movement, stated their support for the protest, including actors Svetlana Bojković, Seka Sablić, Petar Božović. Nebojša Zelenović, the leader of Together for Serbia (ZZS), called for everyone to join the protest regardless of their political affiliation. Protesters gathered at Pioneers Park, Belgrade at around 14:00 (UTC+01:00), and they demanded Rio Tinto leave Serbia. Several thousand demonstrators attended the protest. Ćuta said they would block the road on Branko's Bridge and if the "mechanization" appeared towards Loznica, they would start "roadblocking across Serbia". Shortly after, the protesters walked towards Branko's Bridge, where they blocked traffic for two hours. Deputy Prime Minister Zorana Mihajlović criticised the protest while Vučić compared the protesters to anti-vaxxers.

6 November 
The next protest was held on 6 November in front of the building of Radio Television of Serbia (RTS). A day before the protest, whistleblowers released the plan for "Project Jadar" to the public. The Regulatory Body for Electronic Media (REM) allowed RTS to advertise Rio Tinto's messages regarding the project, although the decision was met with opposition from 30 organisations that demanded the advertisement be taken down because it allegedly violated the Act on Advertisement. The protest was attended by around 200 demonstrators who demanded RTS remove the advertisements of the project.

19 November 
Another protest, which "Kreni-Promeni" organised, was held in front of the RTS building on 19 November. It was attended by 200 demonstrators, who demanded RTS broadcast an anti-Rio Tinto advertisement. RTS later publicly refused to broadcast the advertisement.

22–24 November 
On 21 November 2021, "Ecological Uprising" announced it would organise a protest in Makiš on the day when the construction of the Belgrade Metro would begin. Ćuta invited opposition leaders to participate in the protest. SSP accepted his request. Demonstrators blocked the road at the construction site for an hour and no incidents were reported at the protest site. A day later, "Assembly of Free Serbia" called for a protest to be held in front of the House of the National Assembly after the adoption of the expropriation law, and the law on referendum and people's initiative. The protest was attended by 200 demonstrators, and they demanded the government to repeal both laws. Actor Bojana Novaković took part in the protest. , the campaign director of  "Kreni-Promeni", announced he had sent a petition with 68,000 signatories who opposed the law on referendum, and over 200,000 signatories who were against Rio Tinto. On the same day, protests were held in front of the Novi dvor, in which thousands of protesters participated. They requested the government should repeal the referendum law.

27–29 November 

Shortly after the protests on 24 November, "Ecological Uprising" called for another protest to be held on 27 November, at which it would block major roads across Serbia for two hours. Besides them, "Kreni-Promeni" also announced it would take part. Organisers called the police to stand by their side although during the protests, police blocked the demonstrators and police brutality occurred.

Two thousand demonstrators took part in the protests; they blocked several roads across Serbia for an hour. Several demonstrators were detained, and fights broke out between the demonstrators and groups of masked men. A violent incident that took place in Šabac gained national attention; a demonstrator stopped a bulldozer that tried to drive through a group of demonstrators. The demonstrator was briefly detained and was released two days after the protest. A number of violent incidents were reported throughout the day; armed hooligans attacked demonstrators. A member of the National Assembly affiliated with the Serbian Progressive Party (SNS) also took part in a fight with demonstrators. "Assembly of Free Serbia" demanded the detainees' release, while SSP, DS, Narodna, and NDB condemned the incidents. Brnabić compared the protests with "fascism" while Aleksandar Vulin, the Minister of Internal Affairs, called for police to use violence. Mayor of Novi Sad Miloš Vučević stated armed hooligans were not sent by SNS.

A day later, two more protests were held in Belgrade. The protesters demanded the release of detainees. SNS organised a counter-protest in Šabac on 29 November in support of the pro-government activist that rode the bulldozer. Two observers were assaulted at the counter-protest and one photographer's equipment was stolen. A protest organised by local environmental groups was held in Loznica on the same day.

4 December 

The Association of Environmental Organisations of Serbia (SEOS) called for protests to continue until the demands were met. Manojlović called for nonviolence and stated if provocateurs arrive, the demonstrators should withdraw from the protest. Shortly before the protest on 4 December, it was announced roads in over fifty cities would be blocked. A day before the protest, government-associated media spread a message by a "Lila revolucija" initiative that stated people should throw buckets of purple paint at cars that try to block traffic. A group of lawyers voiced their support for the protest while non-governmental organisations stated police should protect journalists during the protests.

Thousands of demonstrators took place in the protests across Serbia. Gazela Bridge was roadblocked by several thousand demonstrators. Multiple incidents occurred in Novi Sad; a group of pro-government activists attacked a group of demonstrators and a journalist was pepper-sprayed. In Belgrade, a group of men held torchlights in front of the protesters. Additionally, protests in support of the environmental protests were held in the New York City, Berlin, Paris and London. Some demonstrators were charged with misdemeanor afterwards. 

During the protests, Vučić was in Gornje Nedeljice, where he held a press conference during which he announced he would propose amendments to the expropriation law. Manojlović and "Ecological Uprising" proclaimed the protests a "success" and a "great victory for the citizens"; Manojlović later withdrew his statement. A day after the protests, Manojlović and Zelenović had a polemic during the Utisak nedelje show. Zelenović expressed support for the expansion of the demands but Manojlović opposed the move because "the story would be diluted"; he compared the move to the 1 of 5 million protests, which had failed due to this move. Two days later, Manojlović said the protests wouldn't end until the demands were met.

11–14 December 
"Ecological Uprising" announced that on 11 December, roadblocks would be held in fifty locations. Forty civic initiatives took part in the protest; Manojlović and his "Kreni-Promeni" organisation did not participate. After the government adopted two main demands, the protesters continued to demand Rio Tinto leave Serbia. Sporadic incidents occurred in Belgrade and Niš. In Belgrade, a group of right-wing and anti-vaccine activists participated in the protest, and a group of pro-government activists waved pro-Rio Tinto banners. Protests in support of the demonstrators were held in Brussels, Prague, Washington, D.C., Berlin, New York City and London. Following the protest, Mihajlović said Ćuta was supporting "a violent change of government". A day later, a protest occurred in Zrenjanin while on 14 December, a few hundred secondary-school students protested against Rio Tinto in Čačak.

16–18 December 
SEOS and "Eco Brigade" organised a protest in Jagodina on 16 December. A couple of hundred demonstrators that expressed their opposition to the opening of a lithium mine on the Morava Valley took part in the protest. Ćuta announced on 16 December the following protest would be held on 18 December Activists from several environmental organisations stated demanded the government to withdraw the document which would determine the spatial plan for Project Jadar; and said the protests "should be radicalized" if the demands were not met. The protest on 18 December began at 14:00 (UTC+01:00) in front of the building of the Government of Serbia; protests were also held in several other locations in Serbia. The number of demonstrators was smaller in comparison with previous protests. In Užice, police identified multiple journalists and demonstrators that participated in the protest.

24–25 December 
A group of high-school students organised another protest in opposition to Rio Tinto on 24 December. In co-operation with several environmental organisations, ZZS stated the following protest would be held on 25 December. Around 200 demonstrators took part in the protest. Another protest was held in Laznica, a village located near Žagubica, on the same day. It was organised by "Ecological Uprising".

2022

3 January 

After Vučić stated Project Jadar would not be cancelled, SEOS announced it would organise a protest on 3 January. "Ecological Uprising" and "Assembly of Free Serbia" stated they would also take part in the protest. The protest lasted three hours and it was held in Gornje Nedeljice and other cities across Serbia, and in London, in front of the Rio Tinto building. An incident occurred in Preljina, a village near Čačak, in which a woman was hit by a car. In Belgrade, a group of anti-vaccine activists blocked the highway for around 15 minutes. Vučić stated after the protests that "the government fulfilled the demands, and the continuation of the protests is only political".

8–12 January 
The 8 January protests were held in seven locations across Serbia. Additionally, the police recorded the demonstrators during the protests. Several incidents occurred during the protests in Belgrade and Novi Sad. Vučević and Mihajlović criticised the protests. A day later, a protest occurred in Gornji Milanovac. On 10 January, a group of "We Won't Give Jadar" activists threw eggs at the Rio Tinto building; one activist was later detained. Protests continued on 12 January; they were held in front of the building of the Government of Serbia. "Ecological Uprising" and SEOS demanded the government publish documents related to Rio Tinto and its spatial plan.

15–16 January 
Further protests were held on 15 January. A couple of thousand demonstrators attended the protests, which took place in eleven locations. An incident occurred around 14:00 (UTC+01:00) in Preljina when a group of people tried passing through the crowd of demonstrators. In Belgrade, a driver tried to pass through a crowd of protesters but was forced to go back. In Šabac, a driver injured one demonstrator. Marčelo, who took part in the 2018–2020 protests, participated in the protest in Belgrade. A day later, a group of Serbian citizens held a protest in Brussels.

18–22 January 
An incident occurred in front of the building of the National Assembly on 18 January, when Savo Manojlović and other "Kreni-Promeni" activists wanted to request an urgent verification of the people's initiative in the parliament regarding the ban on the exploitation of lithium. This prompted Manojlović to organise a protest on 20 January; Manojlović demanded the government to repeal Rio Tinto's spatial plan and to introduce a moratorium on banning lithium and boron mining for the next 20 years. The protest took place in front of the Novi dvor. On the day of the protest, Brnabić announced that the spatial plan had been scrapped. Manojlović and Ćuta then stated that the abolition of the spatial plan was allegedly done in an incorrect manner, and claimed that Rio Tinto would come back after the April 2022 general election. SEOS and the "Ecological Uprising" organisation announced that they would organise a protest on 22 January in Loznica. A group of activists and environmental organisations took part in the protest.

27 January – 3 February 
"Kreni-Promeni" and several environmental activists organised the 27 January protest. It began in front of the building of the presidency, after which a protest walk that concluded in front of the building of the government was held. The "Eco Guard" initiative organised a protest on 30 January; several hundred demonstrators took part. The protest was also attended by "Kreni-Promeni" and NDB. A minor protest was held in New Belgrade on 1 February.

Further mass protests were held on 2 February in Valjevo. A day later, police contacted Manojlović, who organised the protest on 2 February, and told him further protests would be considered "illegal". Manojlović ignored the notice and organised a protest on 3 February. Around 2,000 demonstrators took part in the protest.

8–15 February 
A protest was held on 8 February in Kragujevac; it was organised by SEOS and "Kreni-Promeni", who had announced they would camp outside the Novi dvor building until the government implements a moratorium on the mining of lithium and boron. Manojlović later stated protestors would camp until the dissolution of the National Assembly, which took place on 15 February. A protest was held on 10 February in front of Novi dvor. Activists held another protest on 13 February. A day before the dissolution of the National Assembly, Manojlović stated the protest on 15 February would take part in front of the Palace of Serbia. On the day of the protest, police deployed a cordon around the Palace of Serbia to prevent the activists from approaching the building. Multiple incidents occurred; one demonstrator was hit by a moving car while two more were run down by another car.

Response and reactions

Support and opposition 

The government's decision to support Rio Tinto's investment and adopt the modified expropriation law was met with opposition from environmental activists, academics, geologists and NGOs. A number of public figures, such as Novak Đoković, Bojana Novaković and Emir Kusturica, voiced their support for the protests. Zoran Tomić, a professor at the Faculty of Law in Belgrade, stated the government allegedly committed three offences related to the protests, and on 11 December, dean Ratko Ristić voiced his support for the protests. 

The environmental protests were also supported by Dveri, whose members participated in the protests in Niš; the Serbian Party Oathkeepers (SSZ), Liberation Movement, and League of Social Democrats of Vojvodina (LSV). Miloš Jovanović, the president of the Democratic Party of Serbia (DSS), condemned the violence that took place on 27 November. Former President Boris Tadić and former Minister Goran Trivan voiced their support for the protests. Bishop Grigorije Durić also voiced his support for the protests but Patriarch Porfirije called upon protesters to "end the fight". Filip Karađorđević also stated his support for the protest. According to an opinion poll that was published in early December 2021, a majority of respondents supported the protests; around 14% of Serbian Progressive Party (SNS) adherents supported the protests. Bratislav Jugović, a SNS MP, stated the "protests are justified" but that "[Dragan] Đilas and his clique abuse them". Croatian Member of the European Parliament (MEP) Ivan Vilibor Sinčić, leader of the Human Shield (ŽZ) party, criticised the government's approach to Rio Tinto.

The president of the Regulatory Body for Electronic Media (REM) Olivera Zekić stated "everyone who protests should be arrested" while the president of the far-right Serbian Radical Party (SRS) Vojislav Šešelj voiced his opposition to the protests by saying the "blockades are being directed from outside [Serbia] and that these are not environmental protests". Nebojša Krstić said "members of Kreni-Promeni should practice jumping from the bridge"; Krstić also called for the arrest of Savo Manojlović. MP Vladimir Đukanović criticised the protests and stated his support for Rio Tinto.

Government response 
Vučić stated on 28 November he "would wait for his legal team's opinion before signing the expropriation law". Following the 4 December protests, Vučić proposed the amendments to the expropriation law but four days later, he announced the expropriation law had been withdrawn. The National Assembly adopted the amendments for the law on referendum and people's initiative on 10 December. The same day, Vučić announced the City Assembly of Loznica would abolish the spatial plan regarding Project Jadar, which would delay Rio Tinto's start of operations until further notice; the plan was abolished two days later. Vučić, who was initially supportive of Project Jadar, said in January 2022 he "would hope that the government would terminate the contracts with Rio Tinto". The "We Won't Give Jadar" and "Protect Jadar" environmental organisations assessed the moves as opportunistic. "Protect Jadar" stated "Vučić should stop manipulating with empty promises".

On 8 January, Brnabić announced the government "was close to annulling all permits given to Rio Tinto", while Mihajlović stated "the Project Jadar had been stopped temporarily at the requests of the citizens". In December 2021 and January 2022, Brnabić gave mixed statements; she said the government never made an agreement with Rio Tinto, but at the same time she said the government did give permits to Rio Tinto. Brnabić later announced the government had abolished the spatial plan. Brnabić accused Western governments of allegedly supporting the protests but their embassies said they had no involvement.

Aftermath
Vesna Prodanović, the general director of "Rio Sava Exploration", stated on 23 December the company would plan to stop Project Jadar. Shortly after the announcement, Gornje Nedeljice residents said Rio Tinto workers had abeen going home-by-home in Gornje Nedeljice, and that the residents received SMS messages from them. Following the nullification of the Rio Tinto spatial plan, its stock collapsed. Activists continued to say Rio Tinto continued to operate after Brnabić's statements in January, although Rio Tinto publicly refuted the claims. Savo Manojlović collected over 32,000 signatures for the people's initiative against the exploitation of lithium; he later said over 290,000 online signatures were also submitted.

In mid-November 2021, Ćuta announced "Ecological Uprising" would participate in the 2022 general election, and on 14 November he signed an agreement with Zelenović's ZZS party to participate on a joint list in the general election. Following the announcement, their coalition was polled at 9% on the national-level and 13% in Belgrade. In January 2022, the coalition was formalised under the name We Must. In the general election, the coalition won around 5% of the popular vote and 13 seats in the National Assembly.

An environmental protest was held in Novi Sad on 21 July 2022. Police intervened and a group of hooligans attacked demonstrators. The attacks were condemned by SPP, Narodna, DS, Dveri, and Together. Another protest that was held on 28 July, received support from local environmental organisations. Demonstrators threw paint buckets and broke into the premises of the SNS, and a driver attempted to drive through a crowd of demonstrators.

See also 
 2020 Serbian protests
 2022 Serbian general election
 Police brutality

Notes and references

Notes

References

Further reading

2021 in Serbia
2022 in Serbia
2021 protests
2022 protests
Protests in Serbia
September 2021 events in Serbia
November 2021 events in Serbia
December 2021 events in Serbia
January 2022 events in Serbia
February 2022 events in Serbia
Environmental protests
Political history of Serbia
Environmentalism in Europe